The International Emmy Award for Best TV Movie or Miniseries is presented by the International Academy of Television Arts & Sciences (IATAS) to the best miniseries or made-for-television films, initially produced and aired outside the United States.

Rules & Regulations 
According to the rules of the International Academy, the award is for a production that has a distinct beginning, middle and end with a finite number of episodes, usually between one and twelve. The program should fit the minimum format length of a televised half-hour time slot. For a TV movie it is considered only a single episode, whereas a miniseries must include more than two episodes. If the show is part of an anthology series, episodes that fall into this category must be more than one hour in length.

Winners and nominees

2000s

2010s

2020s

References

External links
 Official website

 
Movie or miniseries